Plop may refer to:

 "Plop", the nickname of fictional Pete Miller, a character from the US television series The Office
 Kabouter Plop, the eponymous hero of the Belgian children's TV and comic strip series
 Plop, the Hungarian name for Plopi village, Valea Ierii Commune, Cluj County, Romania
 Plop, a slang word for feces
Plop, a village in Coşcalia Commune, Căuşeni district, Moldova
Plop, a village in Ghelari Commune, Hunedoara County, Romania
Plop (owl), the main character in The Owl Who was Afraid of the Dark by Jill Tomlinson
Plop, Donduşeni, a commune in Donduşeni district, Moldova
 Plop: The Hairless Elbonian, a Dilbert-spinoff comic strip by Scott Adams
 Plop!, a self-described "New Magazine of Weird Humor!" comic book published by DC Comics that ran from Sep/Oct 1973 to Nov/Dec 1976
Plop-Ştiubei, a commune in Căuşeni district, Moldova
A type of glissando in music

PLoP refers to:
 Pattern Languages of Programs, an annual computer science conference
 PloP boot manager (see Comparison of boot loaders), makes it possible to boot from CD-ROM or USB without bios support

PLOP refers to:
 PLate OPtimizer, the CAD program for optimization of telescope mirror support cells to reduce cell induced errors.